"You'll Never Find Me" is a song by American nu metal band Korn, released as the lead single from their thirteenth studio album The Nothing.

Background 
The initial working title of the song, Smog Check, was due to the day of its recording coinciding with a car mechanic appointment with guitarist Brian Welch.

The official visualizer, released on YouTube the day after its release, features a hanging, pulsating anthropomorphic structure composed of black wires, which also features on the album's artwork. The visualizer was produced by Chris Schoenman.

A music video, described by NME as "chilling" and "bleak", was later released on July 17. This video, directed by Andzej Gavriss, features the band performing in a desert landscape interspersed with an "intriguing narrative" of a form of experimentation.

Along with the single was revealed the release date of The Nothing, its track listing, and commentary from Davis regarding the title of the album.

Composition 
You'll Never Find Me has been described be Revolver Magazine as containing "a bulky, staccato riff" characteristic of Korn's other songs, and a "vertically leaping repeating groove". It has also been described as reminiscent form songs from their prior albums Untouchables and Take a Look in the Mirror, with the songs Break Some Off and Bottled Up Inside highlighted specifically due to the similarity in pre-chorus buildup between the three. The ending of the song has been compared to that of their iconic 1994 song Daddy.

Reception 
You'll Never Find Me was ranked 16th in Kerrang's ranking of The 20 greatest Korn songs.

Personnel 
 Jonathan Davis – lead vocals
 James "Munky" Shaffer – guitars
 Brian "Head" Welch – guitars
 Reginald "Fieldy" Arvizu – bass
 Ray Luzier – drums

Charts

References 

2019 songs
2019 singles
Korn songs
Songs written by Jonathan Davis
Songs written by James Shaffer
Songs written by Brian Welch
Songs written by Reginald Arvizu
Songs written by Billy Corgan
Roadrunner Records singles